Anna of Mecklenburg (14 October 15334 July 1602), was a Duchess consort of Courland by marriage to the Duke of Courland, Gotthard Kettler. She was the daughter of Albrecht VII, Duke of Mecklenburg and Anna of Brandenburg. Anna is the first woman in Livonia whose life story is entirely historically confirmed.

Biography
Anna was raised in the Lutheran faith in Mecklenburg, where the reformation had recently been introduced.

She married the Duke of Courland, Gotthard Kettler, on 11 March 1566 in Königsberg. Her marriage was very late for a princess of her period. The marriage was initiated in 1564, and the alliance between Courland and Mecklenburg brought both wealth and important foreign connections to Germany to the recently founded Duchy of Courland.

Anna and Gotthard lived with their household in Riga from their wedding until 1578, when the first Ducal Palace of Mitau was ready to live in. Anna of Mecklenburg was described as a well educated cultural patron, who is credited for having played an important role in the development of art in the new state of Courland.

In this role, she is credited with having commissioned the art of local churches from local artists rather than foreign artists, which had been the normal in Courland.  She is also credited with having organized the first Ducal court. She corresponded with her relatives in Germany, maintaining foreign diplomatic connections to the Duchy.

She was widowed in 1587. In 1598, she visited her brother in Gustrow.

Children
She had the following children:
Anna Kettler (1567–1617); married in 1586 to Albrecht Radziwiłł.
Friedrich Kettler (1569–1642); married in 1600 Elisabeth Magdalena of Pomerania, no issue.
Wilhelm Kettler (1574–1640); married in 1609 Sophia of Brandenburg-Prussia:
Jacob Kettler; succeeded as Duke of Courland and Semigallia. Married Margravine Louise Charlotte of Brandenburg and had issue.

References

 Julia Trinkert,   Herzogin Anna von Mecklenburg–Kurland (1533–1602) – Ambitionierte Kunstvermittlerin Am Kurländischen Hofe Des Ausgehenden 16. Jarhundrets?

1533 births
1602 deaths
16th-century Latvian people
Duchesses of Courland
Burials in the Ducal Crypt of the Jelgava Palace
16th-century Latvian women
Daughters of monarchs